The Asian, also known as the Malayan, is a cat breed similar to the Burmese but in a range of different coat colours and patterns. Long-haired Asians of all varieties are called Tiffanies. Asians are grouped in the foreign section at cat shows.

Origin
The breed was developed in Britain, starting with a litter of kittens bred in 1981 by Baroness Miranda von Kirchberg.

Description

Appearance
It has a broad, rounded chest and slender legs with a tail of medium length. The pleasantly rounded head has no flattened areas, and there is a very visible spot in its profile. This gives the Asian a full-looking face. The round and wide-set eyes come in the colour of yellow. Females are not quite as big as the males. They can weigh anywhere from 6–13 pounds.

Coat and colours
The short-haired coat of the Asian is fine, satiny and glossy, and can be multiple colors and patterns. Asian Shorthairs are classified in four different varieties: the Asian Self (including the Bombay, which is a black Asian Self), the Asian Tabby, the Asian Smoke and the Burmilla (which is a shaded Asian).

Temperament
Asians are very affectionate and good with children. They share similar traits with the Burmese. They love to play, explore and even enjoy traveling by way of a cat carrier. They are quite a talkative and rather loud cat with an apparent strong will. They enjoy interacting with people, even with strangers.

Reproduction
The females usually go into their first heat at around six to eight months old. Although registered as a separate breed, Asians can produce Burmese phenotype kittens which are known as Asian Variants, these are almost identical to Burmese. Variants cannot be shown in Breed classes but can grace the Pedigree Household Pet Section at GCCF shows. There are over 600 variations on colours and patterns within the breed, some of which are very rare.

See also
 Chantilly-Tiffany cat
 Asian Semi-longhair
 Burmese (cat)

References

External links 

Bombay and Asian Self Breed Club
Asian Cat Association
Asian Group Cat Society
Photos of Asians
FBRL Breed Page: Asian

Cat breeds
Cat breeds originating in the United Kingdom